The Cynic, the Rat and the Fist  is an Italian poliziotteschi film directed in 1977 by Umberto Lenzi and third entry into the Tanzi/Moretto/Monnezza shared universe
 as well as serving as a direct sequel to The Tough Ones. The film was described by Italian film critic and historian Roberto Curti as "a sequel of sorts" to Lenzi's 1976 The Tough Ones, with Maurizio Merli reprising the role of Inspector Leonardo Tanzi.

The title of the movie inspired the book Cinici infami e violenti (2005), written by Daniele Magni and Silvio Giobbio, a book guide about "Poliziotteschi".

Plot 
Luigi "The Chinaman" Maietto  escapes from prison. As soon as he is free he assigns immediately two henchman to murder the inspector whose testimonial once led to his prison sentence. Inspector Tanzi is left for dead but survives. The local newspapers cover up for him and pretend the assassination had succeeded. When Tanzi gets better, his superior wants him to hide in Switzerland. But Tanzi defies him because he intends to make sure himself that Maietto is put back in prison. He goes for it.

Cast 
Maurizio Merli as Leonardo Tanzi
Tomas Milian as Luigi "The Chinaman" Maietto
John Saxon as Frank Di Maggio
Renzo Palmer as Commissioner Astalli
Gabriella Lepori as Nadia
Robert Hundar as Dario
Bruno Corazzari as Cesare Ettore
Marco Guglielmi as Marchetti, Di Maggio's lawyer
Gabriella Giorgelli as Maria Balzano
Guido Alberti as Tanzi's Uncle
Gianni Musy as Nicola Proietti
Gianfilippo Carcano as The Professor
Massimo Bonetti as "Cappuccino"
Riccardo Garrone as Natali
Ennio Antonelli as barber in jail

Production
Screenwriter Ernesto Gastaldi later spoke negatively on his work on the film "the story wasn't mine, and I just did supervising work on the finished script. Actually, I didn't even like the movie." The film was shot at Elios film and on location in Rome.

Release
The Cynic, the Rat, and the Fist was distributed theatrically in Italy by Medusa on February 3, 1977. It grossed a total of 1,818,523,920 Italian lira on its domestic release in Italy, an amount Curti described as "very successful at the box office."

Notes

References

External links

1977 films
Poliziotteschi films
Films directed by Umberto Lenzi
Films shot in Rome
Films scored by Franco Micalizzi
1970s Italian films